The Louisiana State Open was the state open golf tournament in the U.S. state of Louisiana, open to both amateur and professional golfers.

History 
The inaugural event was held in 1937 and won by Gray Little. The event was not held in the mid-1940s due to World War II. The tournament re-started in November of 1946. The tournament and was held at Louisiana State University's golf course in Baton Rouge, Louisiana. The eligibility requirements were reported as: "Professionals and amateurs who have been residents of the state 60 days prior to the tourney are eligible. Also all military personnel and students at Louisiana schools are eligible." In the mid-1950s, the state open and the state's professional golf organization championships started to be played concurrently. 

In 1963, Homero Blancas, then a private in the military, won the tournament. He was one of the first amateurs to win the event. Blancas was one of the most notable champions and would go on to a lengthy career on the PGA Tour. In 1969, the 29th event was held at Acadin Hills Country Club.

Winners 

Source:

See also
Chitimacha Louisiana Open (Korn Ferry Tour event)

References 

Golf in Louisiana
State Open golf tournaments